Josephine Mary Premice (July 21, 1926 – April 13, 2001) was a Haitian-American actress and singer known for her work on the Broadway stage.

Early life
Josephine Mary Premice was born in Brooklyn, New York, the daughter of Thelomaine and Lucas Premice. Her parents were part of the Haitian aristocracy who fled Haiti after her father, Lucas Premice, who allegedly had claim to the title Count de Brodequin, was part of a failed rebellion to try to overthrow the head of state. Lucas was imprisoned in Guiana. He and a fellow prisoner to whom he was chained escaped and fled through the woods to friends that awaited them on the coast. On the third day of their journey, the other man died, and Lucas is said to have had to cut off the man's arm to free himself from the chains. He was brought to France, where he learned to cut fur for the couturiers. He eventually immigrated to New York in the early 1920s.

Premice and her sister, Adele, were given the education and training of an "at-home finishing school" and treated like part of the elite, at a time when African Americans were treated as second-class citizens, even in the northern states.

Theatre
Premice made her Broadway debut in a 1945 revue show called Blue Holiday. The show was choreographed by Katherine Dunham, with whom Josephine had studied dance and her co-star was Ethel Waters. She was in the pre-Broadway cast of the musical House of Flowers with Diahann Carroll and Pearl Bailey. Josephine was nominated for a Tony Award for her work in the 1957 musical Jamaica as Ginger alongside leading lady Lena Horne. Her next Broadway appearance in A Hand Is on the Gate, where she performed African American poetry works alongside James Earl Jones, Cicely Tyson, and Gloria Foster, garnered her a second Best Featured Actress in a Musical Tony Award nomination. Her final Broadway appearance came in 1976 with the musical Bubbling Brown Sugar. Reviewing the production in The New York Times, Clive Barnes wrote that Ms. Premice "can almost make a feather boa come alive."

Film and television
Premice played a supporting role in the 1974 television movie The Autobiography of Miss Jane Pittman as Ms. Gautier. She guest-starred on The Jeffersons in 1979, playing Louise Jefferson's sister, and The Cosby Show in 1986. Between 1991 and 1993, she guest-starred as Desiree Porter (after an initial appearance as Erdine Abernathy) in several episodes of A Different World.

Later years
An alumna of Columbia University with a degree in anthropology, she was also known for her calypso recordings and fashion sense.

Premice died in her Manhattan residence on April 13, 2001 at the age of 74 from complications of emphysema. She and her estranged husband, Timothy Fales, had two children, Enrico Fales (b. 1959) and Susan Fales-Hill (b. 1962). In 2003, her daughter published a biography of her mother titled Always Wear Joy: My Mother, Bold and Beautiful.

References

External links

Columbia University alumni
American people of Haitian descent
American stage actresses
1926 births
2001 deaths
Actresses from New York City
American television actresses
20th-century American actresses
People from Brooklyn
20th-century Haitian people
Deaths from emphysema